Michael Rice (born 25 October 1997) is a British pop singer. He represented the United Kingdom at the Eurovision Song Contest 2019 in Tel Aviv, Israel with the song "Bigger than Us", placing in 26th. Prior to this, he won the first series of BBC One's singing competition All Together Now in 2018, and also appeared in the eleventh series of The X Factor in 2014.

Career

2014–2019: The X Factor and All Together Now
In 2014, Rice entered series 11 of The X Factor in the United Kingdom. He auditioned for the show with "I Look to You" by Whitney Houston. He was eliminated following the Bootcamp stage. In 2018, he entered the first series of BBC One's singing competition All Together Now, he went on to win the competition. In 2019 he was crowned the winner of BBC Two’s Eurovision: You Decide competition with his song ‘Bigger Than Us’ - this won him the right to represent the United Kingdom in Tel-Aviv.

2019–present: Eurovision Song Contest
In January 2019, Rice was confirmed as one of six artists competing in Eurovision: You Decide, the British national selection show for the Eurovision Song Contest 2019. On 8 February 2019, he won the show with the song "Bigger than Us", written by Laurell Barker, Anna-Klara Folin, John Lundvik and Jonas Thander, and represented the United Kingdom in the Eurovision final in Tel Aviv, Israel and came in last position with 11 points.

Discography

Singles
As lead artist

As featured artist

References

1997 births
21st-century British male singers
Living people
English male singers
English pop singers
Eurovision Song Contest entrants for the United Kingdom
Eurovision Song Contest entrants of 2019
21st-century English singers
People from Hartlepool
Musicians from County Durham
Singing talent show winners